Rajwinder Singh (born 7 May 1989) is an Indian first-class cricketer who plays for Punjab.

References

External links
 

1989 births
Living people
Indian cricketers
Punjab, India cricketers
Cricketers from Patiala